Watson Studio, formerly Data Science Experience or DSX, is IBM’s software platform for data science. The platform consists of a workspace that includes multiple collaboration and open-source tools for use in data science.

In Watson Studio, a data scientist can create a project with a group of collaborators, all having access to various analytics models and using various languages (R/Python/Scala). Watson Studio brings together staple open source tools including RStudio, Spark and Python in an integrated environment, along with additional tools such as a managed Spark service and data shaping facilities, in a secure and governed environment.

Watson Studio provides access to data sets that are available through Watson Data Platform, on-premises or on the cloud. The platform also has a large community and embedded resources such as articles on the latest developments from the data science world and public data sets. The platform is available in on-premises, cloud, and desktop forms.

History 
IBM announced the launch of Data Science Experience at the Spark Summit 2016 in San Francisco. IBM invested $300 million in efforts to make Spark the analytics operating system for all of the company's big data efforts.

In June 2017, Hortonworks and IBM announced their partnership to collaborate on IBM's Data Science Experience. Hortonworks previously had a partnership relationship with Microsoft.

In 2018, the Data Science Experience platform was renamed IBM Watson Studio.

See also 

 Oracle Cloud

References 

IBM software